"Ready to Go" is a song by English alternative rock band Republica, released as a single on 15 April 1996 from the band's debut album, Republica (1996). Two versions of the song, the US mix and the original mix, were included. This version was later featured on a greatest hits collection, Ready to Go: The Best Of.

The single originally reached number 43 on the UK Singles Chart in April 1996. Later in the year, a remix of the song began to gain popularity outside the United Kingdom, charting in Australia, Canada, and the United States. The remix was re-released in the United Kingdom in February 1997, when it reached a new peak of number 13. This rerelease also saw the song chart for the first time in western Europe, reaching number 19 in the Netherlands and number 26 in Ireland.

German DJ Tomcraft released a cover of the song in 2007, and another version was released on 7 June 2010. It continues to be successful in the UK, where it is still frequently featured in advertisements and on TV.

Main versions
"Ready to Go" (unreleased)
Also known as "Ready to Go [1996]", "Ready to Go (original)" or incorrectly as "Ready to Go (album version)", it was not included in any of the band's albums. It is an unreleased song or probably an early demo with slightly different vocal (but lyrics remain the same). This version is softer than both the US and original mixes of the song. It does not have the piano bridge of the original mix, nor the guitar bridge of the US mix. The bridge is similar to that of the original mix, except it lacks a piano.

"Ready to Go" (original mix)
This version has a more techno-pop sound while the later version contains electric guitars. It charted at number 43 in the United Kingdom and number 40 in Australia.

"Ready to Go"
A mix was included in the Republica album as the opening track. It was remixed by Ben Grosse and released as a single in 1997. This version is the most well-known. It sounds faster and its beat is stronger, making it heavier in terms of tones. On the UK and American issues of the Republica album, this mix of the song was credited just as "Ready to Go", and on the European issue of the album it is sometimes marked as "Ready to Go (US mix)". A defining difference between this mix and earlier recordings is the inclusion of a guitar bridge in the place of a piano bridge.

"Ready to Go" (Tomcraft version)
German DJ Tomcraft released a Eurodance version of the track in 2007.

"Ready to Go 2010"
A new version of the track was released in June 2010. A preview of the track was made available on the band's official Myspace page. The new version has a more aggressive sound than its two predecessors.

Critical reception
Scottish Aberdeen Evening Express stated that "this classic bit of punk-fuelled dance could well do the business." Daina Darzin from Cash Box felt the song "has monster radio hit written all over it." She added, "An intense, percolating, anthemic dance/rock thing that begs to boom out of the radios of convertibles nationwide, "Ready To Go" has been the Modern Rock #1 most added two weeks in a row, with consecutive double digit adds, including 99X in Atlanta, The Edge in Dallas, WBCN in Boston and Q101 in Chicago." The Daily Vault's Alfredo Narvaez declared it as "one of the best examples of pop mixing with techno. The song throws in acoustic guitars, electric guitars and every other noise you can think of and it sounds great." Tracey Pepper from Entertainment Weekly noted that it "erupts with a blast of fuzzed-out power chords, driving dance rhythms, and a rallying sing-along chorus." 

Elysa Gardner from Los Angeles Times complimented its "yummy hooks and breathless dance beats", that are "as irresistible as singer Saffron’s Debbie Harry-meets-Siouxsie Sioux moxie. Pure, exhilarating fun." Pan-European magazine Music & Media found that here, "techno meets rock guitar with strident vocals from singer Saffron, all adding up to a fresh, gritty pop sound which Europe simply can't afford to miss." A reviewer from Music Week gave the song four out of five, adding that "this techno pop rock outfit, bursting with potential, lay down a mean, radio friendly single." Dave Fawbert from ShortList called it a "bloody good tune". Ben Knowles from Smash Hits said in his review of Republica, that the song is a "good taster from their cocktail of shouty pop, mad bouncy dance and fun guitars." David Sinclair from The Times viewed it as a "rock/dance hybrid featuring the imposing vocals of Saffron".

Music videos
Two different music videos were released for the song. In the original video, lead singer Saffron is jumping on the roof of a building. The video was released in 1996, and the shots took place somewhere in East London. This video is very sunny and upbeat. It is said that it shows the hidden beauty of East London. The video also features lead singer Saffron playing the Sega Saturn video games Virtua Fighter 2 and Hang-On GP. The second music video, produced by Ben Grosse, was released in early 1997. Saffron is shown singing in a warehouse with the band, then she is jumping, dancing and doing humorous mimics in front of the camera, often singing into a large megaphone. The video features rapid edit cuts, fast frame rates and zooming, and artificial colourisation.

Impact and legacy
American entertainment company BuzzFeed ranked "Ready to Go" number 37 in their list of The 101 Greatest Dance Songs Of the '90s in 2017.

Track listing

 1996 UK CD single
 "Ready to Go" (radio edit) – 3:39
 "Ready to Go" (album mix) – 5:01
 "Bloke" – 4:51

 1997 UK CD single
 "Ready to Go" (radio edit) – 3:39
 "Ready to Go" (original mix) – 5:01
 "Bloke" – 4:51
 "Holly" (club mix) – 8:03

 2007 CD single
 "Ready to Go" (club mix)
 "Ready to Go" (radio edit)
 "Ready to Go" (L&T's latenight mix)

 "Ready to Go 2010"
 "Ready to Go 2010" (radio edit) – 3:17
 "Ready to Go 2010" (full length) – 4:15

Charts

Weekly charts

Year-end charts

Certifications

In popular culture

Film and television
 As If
 Queer as Folk
 Vegas Vacation
 GAEA Girls (as Chigusa Nagayo's theme)
 Primeval
 The Ed Schultz Show
 Renford Rejects
 Sugar & Spice
 Sabrina the Teenage Witch
 Baywatch episode: "Buried"
 Beverly Hills, 90210
 Malcolm in the Middle episode: "Billboard"
 Dancing with the Stars – an opening professional number in season 16
 The Voice UK - performed by the judges in season 4
 Mary-Kate and Ashley Olsen's Getting There Summer Catch – appears in the promotional trailer
 Sugar Rush Goodnight Sweetheart – appears in the episode "When Two Worlds Collide"
 Captain Marvel — appears in the promotional trailer
 Yellowjackets

Advertising
 It was used in the advertisement for Suse Linux Enterprise 10 by Novell.
 Extracts from "Ready to Go" were used in the commercial for Jock Jams Vol. 3.
 Extracts from "Ready to Go" are used in the George at Asda adverts in 1998.
 Extracts from "Ready to Go" have been used in the Halfords TV adverts since 2005.
 Extracts from "Ready to Go" are used in Fox Kids TV promos in the UK during the mid-1990s.
 Extracts from "Ready to Go" are used in the Eircell television adverts in Ireland during the mid-1990s.
 Extracts from "Ready to Go" were used in some Dairy Queen advertisements that aired in 2003.
 Mitsubishi used the song to kick off their new "Wake Up and Drive" advertising campaign for the new-for-1999 Galant.
 "Ready to Go" can be heard in Australia and New Zealand on the television advertisements for Holden's range of motor vehicles (2006–2007).
 It was used by MLB Network in April 2010 to advertise upcoming games.
 It was used on Speed Channel's WindTunnel with Dave Despain in February 2006 as part of "Hot Candy" highlighting AMA Supercross Championship and Speedweeks at Daytona.
 It was used for the intro to the 1999 season opening race the (CART) Champ Car Grand Prix of Miami on ABC.
It has been used in advertisements by Denver, Colorado's tourism board.
Wind Creek Bethlehem used "Ready to Go" in promos since 2019.

Sport
 Used as the walkout song for Igor Vovchanchyn in Pride FC.
 From the first ever game at the Stadium of Light up until the 2005–06 season, Sunderland players came out on to the pitch to this song. The track proved a massive hit with Sunderland fans, to the extent that Republica were invited to perform the song live at the Stadium of Light for the last game of Sunderland's record-breaking, league-winning season in May 1999. For the occasion, lead singer Saffron wore a Sunderland top. It was replaced by U2's "Elevation", a switch which was unpopular with many fans, before returning. "Ready to Go" is frequently used by many other clubs for when the players come out.
 The Boston Red Sox usually play this song at Fenway Park before the game begins as the managers have the meeting at home plate each night.
 The song was included on the NHL's Nashville Predators Check, Please! CD, and has been played before home games since 1998.
 The Washington Capitals play this song before the third period of their home games at Capital One Arena.
 It has been played at various US sporting games such as the NBA and the WNBA. It is sometimes played right before the game starts or during a pivotal moment during the game.
 The Dutch sports programme NOS Studio Sport used this song as intro for the highlights of the Barclays Premier League, every weekend.
 The song was used in a video montage that contained highlights of the Chicago Bulls' 1996–97 NBA championship season.
 The song was used by the Michigan State Spartans football team as they took the field until it was replaced by AC/DC's "Thunderstruck".
 Extracts from "Ready to Go" were used for the title music of Sky Sports News's evening update from 2005 to 2007.
 Darts player Mike Veitch uses the song as his walk-on music.
 "Ready to Go" is included in Euro 2000: The Official Album.
 The Buffalo Bandits usually play this song at the start of the second half, just before face off commences.
 The song was used to advertise the 1998 Super Rugby season in New Zealand.
 English Rugby league side Hull F.C. used it as their entrance music for the 2014–15 Super League season.
 The song was regularly played pre-match by English football club Leicester City F.C. when they played at their former home, Filbert Street.
 The song was used in Sky Sports's opening credits for its Scottish Football coverage between 1998/99 & 2001/02.

Other
 "Ready to Go" was the theme song for Top Thrill Dragster, a drag racing-themed roller coaster at Cedar Point in Ohio. It was played in the station of the ride and was heard before launching.
Olivia Rodrigo performed the song on her Sour Tour in 2022.

References

1996 singles
1996 songs
1997 singles
2007 singles
2010 singles
Dance-rock songs
Deconstruction Records singles
Football songs and chants
RCA Records singles
Sunderland A.F.C.
Republica songs